Jean-Philippe Nilor (born 15 May 1965 in Fort-de-France, Martinique) is a French politician who was elected to the French National Assembly on 17 June 2012, representing Martinique's 4th constituency.

He was re-elected in the 2022 French legislative election as a candidate from Péyi-A (NUPES).

References

1965 births
Living people
People from Fort-de-France
Martinican Independence Movement politicians
Black French politicians
Deputies of the 14th National Assembly of the French Fifth Republic
Deputies of the 15th National Assembly of the French Fifth Republic
Deputies of the 16th National Assembly of the French Fifth Republic